Gotlandochiton is an extinct  of polyplacophoran mollusc. Gotlandochiton became extinct during the Silurian period.

References 

Prehistoric chiton genera
Ordovician first appearances
Silurian extinctions